The North Carolina Division of Motor Vehicles is the division of the North Carolina Department of Transportation (NCDOT) which oversees driver licenses and vehicle registrations within the state of North Carolina, USA. 

The North Carolina Department of Motor Vehicles was created by the North Carolina General Assembly in 1941.

See also
Government of North Carolina

References

External links 
 NCDOT DMV
 NC DMV Locations For Titles & Registration

Division of Motor Vehicles
Motor vehicle registration agencies